Louveira is a municipality in the state of São Paulo in Brazil. The population is 49,993 (2020 est.) in an area of 55.1 km2. The elevation is 690 m.

References

Municipalities in São Paulo (state)